Kalorama is a neighborhood in Northwest Washington, D.C., United States. It includes the Kalorama Triangle Historic District and Sheridan-Kalorama Historic District. It is named after the Kalorama mansion. 

Kalorama Triangle is bordered by Connecticut Avenue, Columbia Road, Calvert Street, and Rock Creek Park. Sheridan-Kalorama is adjacent, to the southwest, between Connecticut Avenue, Rock Creek Park, Massachusetts Avenue, and Florida Avenue.

The Sheridan-Kalorama neighborhood includes several diplomatic residences, such as the French ambassador's residence at 2221 Kalorama Road, and the Residence of the Ambassador of the Netherlands at 2347 S Street, as well as 28 embassies. It includes much of Embassy Row on Massachusetts Avenue. The Taft Bridge, carrying Connecticut Avenue over Rock Creek Park, with its concrete lions, is a notable feature. The Spanish Steps are another neighborhood landmark. Notable historic buildings include William E. Borah Apartment, Windsor Lodge, The Lindens, Lothrop Mansion, Miller House, Codman-Davis House, Wyoming Apartments, and the Charles Evans Hughes House. It also includes the Anthony Holmead Archeological Site.

According to Zillow, the median home value in Kalorama is $1.5 million, making it one of Washington's most expensive neighborhoods. It is accessible by the Red Line of the Washington Metro at the Woodley Park and Dupont Circle stations, as well as Metrobus and the DC Circulator.

History

Kalorama was primarily rural until the end of the 19th century. It is northwest of the original limits of Washington City in Pierre Charles L'Enfant's original plan.

In 1795, Gustavus Scott, a commissioner for the District of Columbia, purchased land that had been part of Anthony Holmead's "Widows Mite" holdings. He constructed a large, classically styled house at 23rd and S Streets, which he named Rock Hill. In 1803, Scott's wife, Margaret Scott, sold the property to William Augustine Washington.

In 1807, Joel Barlow, a poet, diplomat, and political philosopher bought the property and renamed it "Kalorama", Greek for "fine view." Barlow lived in the home until shortly before his death in 1812. He commissioned United States Capitol architect Benjamin Latrobe to enlarge the house and elevate its design. The residence was destroyed by a fire during the American Civil War while it was used as a Union hospital. It was rebuilt and returned to a single-family home until 1887, when it was leveled by the District of Columbia government for the extension of S Street NW.

In the early 1880s, the Kalorama area, largely undeveloped because it lay beyond Boundary Street (now Florida Avenue) and thus outside the city limits, began to be subdivided for urban development. In 1893, Congress ordered L'Enfant's design of the city of Washington extended outward to include the rest of the District. Existing developments were exempted, which is why Kalorama is one of the few areas of D.C. that do not adhere to the city's street grid.

Two high bridges over Rock Creek became important to the development of both sides of Kalorama in this period, the Calvert Street bridge (since replaced by the Duke Ellington Bridge), built in 1891, and the Taft Bridge (on Connecticut Avenue), built in 1907.

Kalorama Triangle

The Kalorama Triangle is a residential enclave of Adams Morgan in Northwest Washington, bounded by three major thoroughfares: Connecticut Avenue, Calvert Street, and Columbia Road.

Kalorama Triangle is in the service area of Advisory Neighborhood Commission 1C, the Adams Morgan Advisory Neighborhood Commission, and is represented by the commissioners for 1C02.

Sheridan-Kalorama/Kalorama Heights
Sheridan-Kalorama, also known as Kalorama Heights, is bounded to the north and west by Rock Creek Park; to the south and west by Massachusetts Avenue N.W.; and to the south and east by Florida Avenue and Connecticut Avenue N.W. It is named after American Civil War general Philip Sheridan, of whom there is also a statue in the neighborhood.

Kalorama Heights is assigned to Washington's Sheridan-Kalorama Advisory Neighborhood Commission (ANC 2D) and designated as Single Member District 2D01 (the northeastern half) and 2D02 (the remainder).

The Sheridan-Kalorama Historic District is in southwestern Kalorama.

Education
District of Columbia Public Schools operates public schools. Kalorama Heights is zoned to Marie Reed Elementary School in Adams Morgan. High school students are assigned to Woodrow Wilson High School.

Notable residents and former residents
Sheridan-Kalorama has been home to six presidents:
 Woodrow Wilson purchased a house at 2340 S Street NW in 1921, and lived there until his death three years later. After the 1961 death of Wilson's widow, Edith Bolling Galt Wilson, the Woodrow Wilson House was designated a National Historic Landmark in 1964 and became a museum dedicated to Wilson.
 William Howard Taft lived in the large Colonial Revival house at 2215 Wyoming Avenue from 1921 until his death in 1930. Alvan T. Fuller built the house in 1908 on a design by local architect Appleton P. Clark, Jr., and it is now the Syrian Embassy.
 Franklin D. Roosevelt and Eleanor Roosevelt lived at 2131 R Street NW from 1917 to 1920, while he was Assistant Secretary of the Navy. The house, originally built in 1899 with a 1901 addition, is now the residence of the ambassador of Mali.
 Warren Harding lived at 2314 Wyoming Avenue NW from 1917 to 1921, then as a U.S. senator from Ohio. The house was built in 1915 in the Federal Architecture style on a design by architect George N. Ray, and is now the residence of the ambassador of Monaco.
 Herbert Hoover, when appointed Secretary of Commerce in 1921, purchased a house built by Thomas Gales in 1902 in the Colonial Revival style on a design by Appleton P. Clark, Jr. He lived there with his family until his inauguration in 1929 and after leaving the White House from 1933 to 1944. It has been the Embassy of Burma, then Myanmar since 1954.
 Barack Obama, Michelle Obama, and their two daughters lived in Kalorama after Obama's presidency ended on January 20, 2017.

The neighborhood was home to several Supreme Court Justices, including:
 Charles Evans Hughes
 Louis Brandeis
 Harlan F. Stone
 Joseph McKenna
 Sandra Day O'Connor
Other notable residents and former residents:
 Joel Barlow: he named his house Kalorama, which served as the basis for the name of the neighborhood
 Jeff Bezos purchased a house in Kalorama in 2016 for $23 million, formerly the Textile Museum, and another house nearby for $5 million.
 William Richards Castle Jr., educator and diplomat
 Louis DeJoy, United States Postmaster General
 Frederic Adrian Delano, railroad president and member of Federal Reserve Board of Governors
 Elizabeth Eisenstein, historian
 Ted Kennedy, U.S. senator
 Jared Kushner
 Jack Lew, former United States Secretary of the Treasury
 Adolph C. Miller, member of Federal Reserve Board of Governors
 George W. Renchard, ambassador
 Donald Rumsfeld, former United States Secretary of Defense
 Robert O. Scholz, designer
 Justin B. Smith, CEO of Bloomberg Media
 Rex Tillerson, former United States Secretary of State, acquired a Kalorama house for $5.6 million in 2017
 Ivanka Trump
 Chris Wallace, Fox News anchor

References

External links

 Kalorama Triangle Historic District
 Sheridan-Kalorama Historic District
 ANC 2D Website
 Kalorama Triangle Brochure
 
 
 
  – story about Kalorama from 1844 via Ghosts of DC

 
Neighborhoods in Northwest (Washington, D.C.)
Historic districts on the National Register of Historic Places in Washington, D.C.